During 2008 and 2009, Bristol Rovers Football Club participated in League One, The 2008–09 season covers the period from 1 July 2008 to 30 June 2009. It marks the 126th year of football played by Bristol Rovers F.C. and their 82nd season in The Football League.

Chronological list of events
This is a list of the significant events to occur at the club during the 2007–08 season, presented in chronological order. This list does not include transfers, which are listed in the transfers section below, or match results, which are in the results section.
14 July: Former player Junior Agogo completed a transfer from Nottingham Forest to Egyptian side El Zamalek, earning Rovers an undisclosed amount of money from the sell-on clause agreed when he joined Forest.
5 August: Club chairman Ron Craig stepped down from his position, and was succeeded by Nick Higgs. Craig retained a position on the board of the football club.
11 August: Defender Danny Coles signed a two-year extension to his contract with the club. The new deal expires in the summer of 2012, and was agreed as a result of Rovers receiving a number of transfer bids for the player from Plymouth Argyle.
23 August: Rovers stunned Hereford United with a 6–1 demolition.

Match results

Legend

League One

FA Cup

Carling Cup

Johnstone's Paint Trophy

Team kit
The team kit for the 2008–09 season is produced by Erreà. The main shirt sponsor is Cowlin Construction, a subsidiary of Balfour Beatty, and the secondary shirt sponsor is Blackthorn Cider. The home shirt features the traditional blue and white quarters in a lighter shade of blue from the previous season to match the colour of the sponsor's logo, and the away kit is green with black trim.

Squad

|}

Goalscorers

Discipline

Transfers

In
Seven players have been added to the Bristol Rovers squad since 1 July 2008, in addition to Jeff Hughes who signed at the end of the previous season. Four players were signed from other clubs – Darryl Duffy, who was signed from Swansea City for a fee in the region of £100,000, Ben Hunt, who was signed for free after having been released by West Ham United, Jo Kuffour who was signed from AFC Bournemouth and Liam Harwood who was signed from Carshalton Athletic. Three Bristol Rovers youth players were also awarded their first professional contracts by the club – Ben Swallow, James Tyrell and Joe White, who is the son of former Rovers player Steve White.

Out
{| border="0" width="100%" 
|-
|bgcolor="#FFFFFF" valign="top" align="left" width="100%"|

References

Bristol Rovers F.C. seasons
Bristol Rovers